Sucha Góra TV Tower ( Polish: RTCN Sucha Góra) is a 116 metre tall TV tower of reinforced concrete, situated on the
Sucha Góra TV tower was built in 1962.

Transmitted Programmes

Radio

Digital Television MPEG-4

External links
 http://ukf.pl/index.php/topic,247.0.html
 http://emi.emitel.pl/EMITEL/obiekty.aspx?obiekt=DODR_S4C
 http://radiopolska.pl/wykaz/pokaz_lokalizacja.php?pid=35
 http://www.dvbtmap.eu/mapcoverage.html?chid=9002

Towers in Poland
Towers completed in 1962
Krosno County
Buildings and structures in Podkarpackie Voivodeship